Terry Jones' Medieval Lives is a 2004 television documentary series produced for the BBC. Written and hosted by Terry Jones, each half-hour episode examines a particular Medieval personality, with the intent of separating myth from reality.

The episode The Peasant was nominated for Outstanding Writing for Nonfiction Programming at the 2004 Emmy Awards. Dr. Faye Getz acted as consultant for the series.

Misunderstood history
Being a comedian as well as an historian, Jones takes an established belief, turns that around, and presents proof for his assertion. For example, peasants did not live in complete squalor and actually owned property. Also class divisions were not as severe as people think; there are cases of low-born people who rise to quite high positions.

In the episode on kings, he says, "History isn't necessarily what happened. It's often what people want us to think happened." He uses the following examples:

Richard the Lionheart was actually a bad king, who only saw England (which he hated) as a means to finance his warmongering. Richard III did a lot of good for England. Modern perceptions of these kings are reversed because, Jones asserts, chroniclers of the time were commissioned to write what was politically most convenient.
Louis, Count of Artois (later King of France), was acclaimed as King of England yet appears in no history books (see First Baron's War) because of, Jones asserts, embarrassment over a "second French invasion".

Jones explained his motivation for making this series in the article in The Observer: "The main reason I wanted to make Medieval Lives was to get my own back on the Renaissance. It's not that the Renaissance has ever done me any harm personally, you understand. It's just that I'm sick of the way people's eyes light up when they start talking about the Renaissance. I'm sick of the way art critics tend to say: 'Aaaah! The Renaissance!' with that deeply self-satisfied air of someone who is at last getting down to the 'Real Thing'. And I'm sick to death of that ridiculous assumption that that before the Renaissance human beings had no sense of individuality."

Episode list
The eight episodes were as follows:

 The Peasant
 The Monk
 The Damsel
 The Minstrel
 The Knight
 The Philosopher (Alchemist)
 The Outlaw
 The King

Companion book

External links
 
 BBC Worldwide press release
 Python slams 'overrated' Renaissance BBC News article
The Middle Ages of reason
 

2004 British television series debuts
2004 British television series endings
2000s British documentary television series
Works by Terry Jones
British television miniseries
English-language television shows
BBC television documentaries about medieval history